Martinian (in Latin, Martinianus) can refer to:

Roman emperor Martinian
Claude Martin, the French adventurer
A former pupil of one of the three schools founded by Claude Martin: La Martiniere Calcutta, La Martiniere Lucknow and La Martiniere Lyon.

Several Christian saints share that name:

Saint Martinian, martyr of Rome: see Martinian and Processus,
Saint Martinian, one of the Seven Sleepers of Ephesus.
Saint Martinianus (bishop of Milan), reigned 423–435
Saint Martinian of Byelozersk, Greek Orthodox saint, father superior of Troitse-Sergiyeva Lavra
Saint Martinian of Areovinchus, Greek Orthodox saint, monk
Saint Martinian, Greek Orthodox saint, monk of Zograf Monastery killed along with 26 others in 1275.